Chiaiano is a station on line 1 of the Naples Metro. It was opened on 19 July 1995 as part of the section between Colli Aminei and Piscinola. The station is located between Frullone and Piscinola.

References

Naples Metro stations
Railway stations opened in 1995
1995 establishments in Italy
Railway stations in Italy opened in the 20th century
Railway stations in Italy opened in the 21st century